Phyllosiphon is a genus of parasitic green algae in the class Trebouxiophyceae.

Ecology

Parasite ecology

The species Phyllosiphon arisari Kühn induces necrosis in leaf tissue of Arisarum, after invading the intracellular space.

References

Further reading
Aboal M. & Werner, O. (2011). Morphology, fine structure, life cycle and phylogenetic analysis of Phyllosiphon arisari, a siphonous parasitic green alga. European Journal of Phycology 46(3): 181–192.

Trebouxiophyceae genera
Trebouxiophyceae